The Vanderbilt family is an American family who gained prominence during the Gilded Age. Their success began with the shipping and railroad empires of Cornelius Vanderbilt, and the family expanded into various other areas of industry and philanthropy. Cornelius Vanderbilt's descendants went on to build grand mansions on Fifth Avenue in New York City; luxurious "summer cottages" in Newport, Rhode Island; the palatial Biltmore House in Asheville, North Carolina; and various other opulent homes. The family also built Berkshire cottages in the western region of Massachusetts; examples include Elm Court (Lenox and Stockbridge, Massachusetts).

The Vanderbilts were once the wealthiest family in the United States. Cornelius Vanderbilt was the richest American until his death in 1877. After that, his son William Henry Vanderbilt acquired his father's fortune, and was the richest American until his death in 1885. The Vanderbilts' prominence lasted until the mid-20th century, when the family's 10 great Fifth Avenue mansions were torn down, and most other Vanderbilt houses were sold or turned into museums in what has been referred to as the "Fall of the House of Vanderbilt".

Branches of the family are found on the United States East Coast. Contemporary descendants include American art historian John Wilmerding, journalist Anderson Cooper, actor Timothy Olyphant, musician John P. Hammond, screenwriter James Vanderbilt, and the Duke of Marlborough.

History 

The progenitor of the Vanderbilt family was Jan Aertszoon or Aertson (1620–1705), a Dutch farmer from the village of De Bilt in Utrecht, Netherlands, who emigrated to the Dutch colony of New Netherland as an indentured servant to the Van Kouwenhoven family in 1650. The name of Jan's village, in the genitive case, was added to the Dutch "van" ("from") to create "Van der Bilt", which evolved into "Vanderbilt" when the English took control of New Amsterdam (now Manhattan). The family is associated with the Dutch patrician Van der Bilt.

His great-great-great-grandson, Cornelius Vanderbilt, began the rise of the Vanderbilt dynasty. He was the fourth of nine children born into a Staten Island family of modest means. Through his paternal great-great grandmother, Abigail Southard, he descends from Republic of Salé President Jan Janszoon and his son Anthony Janszoon van Salee. They were among the earliest arrivals to 17th-century New Amsterdam. In a number of documents dating back to that period, Anthony is described as tawny or mulatto, as his mother was of Berber origin from Cartagena in the Kingdom of Murcia. Cornelius Vanderbilt left school at age 11 and went on to build a shipping and railroad empire that, during the 19th century, would make him one of the wealthiest men in the world. Starting with a single boat, he grew his fleet until he was competing with Robert Fulton for dominance of the New York waterways, his energy and eagerness earning him the nickname "Commodore", a United States Navy title for a captain of a small task force. Fulton's company had established a monopoly on trade in and out of New York Harbor. Vanderbilt, based in New Jersey at the time, flouted the law, steaming in and out of the harbor under a flag that read, "New Jersey Must Be Free!" He also hired the attorney Daniel Webster to argue his case before the United States Supreme Court; Vanderbilt won, thereby establishing an early precedent for the United States' first laws of interstate commerce.

While many Vanderbilt family members had joined the Episcopal Church, Cornelius Vanderbilt remained a member of the Moravian Church to his death. 

The Vanderbilt family lived on Staten Island until the mid-1800s, when the Commodore built a house on Washington Place (in what is now Greenwich Village). Although he always occupied a relatively modest home, members of his family would use their wealth to build magnificent mansions. Shortly before his death in 1877, Vanderbilt donated US$1 million (equivalent to $ million in ) for the establishment of Vanderbilt University in Nashville.

The Commodore left the majority of his enormous fortune to his eldest son, William Henry Vanderbilt. William Henry, who outlived his father by just eight years, increased the profitability of his father's holdings, increased the reach of the New York Central Railroad, and doubled the Vanderbilt wealth. He built the first of what would become many grand Vanderbilt mansions on Fifth Avenue, at 640 Fifth Avenue. William Henry appointed his first son, Cornelius Vanderbilt II, as the next "Head of House".

Cornelius II built the largest private home in New York, at 1 West 57th Street, containing approximately 154 rooms, designed by George B. Post. He also built The Breakers in Newport, Rhode Island.

Cornelius II's brother, William Kissam Vanderbilt, also featured prominently in the family's affairs. He also built a home on Fifth Avenue and would become one of the great architectural patrons of the Gilded Age, hiring the architects for (the third, and surviving) Grand Central Terminal. He also built Marble House at 596 Bellevue Avenue in Newport, Rhode Island.

George Washington Vanderbilt II, the 3rd and youngest son of William Henry Vanderbilt and youngest brother of Cornelius II, hired architect Richard Morris Hunt and landscape architect Frederick Law Olmsted to construct Biltmore Estate on  near Asheville, North Carolina.

While some of Cornelius Vanderbilt's descendants gained fame in business, others achieved prominence in other ways, e.g.:
 Alfred Gwynne Vanderbilt (1877–1915), was a passenger on the RMS Lusitania and died when it sank.
Alfred's eldest son, from his first marriage, William Henry Vanderbilt III was Governor of Rhode Island.
Alfred's second son Alfred Jr. became a noted horse breeder and racing elder.
William Kissam Vanderbilt's son Harold Stirling Vanderbilt (1884–1970) gained fame as a sportsman. He invented the contract form of bridge and won the most coveted prize in yacht racing, the America's Cup, on three occasions.
Harold's brother William Kissam "Willie K" Vanderbilt II launched the Vanderbilt Cup for auto racing.
Cornelius Vanderbilt II's granddaughter Gloria Vanderbilt (1924–2019) was a noted artist, designer, actress and author.
Gloria's son, Anderson Cooper, is a Peabody Award and Emmy Award-winning journalist, author, and television producer and personality.
Cornelius Vanderbilt II's daughter Gertrude Vanderbilt Whitney was a sculptor, art patron and collector, and founder of the Whitney Museum of American Art.

In 1855, Commodore Cornelius Vanderbilt donated  of property to the Moravian Church and Cemetery at New Dorp on Staten Island, New York. Later, his son William Henry Vanderbilt donated a further . The Vanderbilt Family Mausoleum was designed in 1885 by architect Richard Morris Hunt and landscaped by Frederick Law Olmsted.

Vanderbilt family tree 

 Cornelius Vanderbilt (1794–1877)
 William Henry Vanderbilt (1821–1885)
 Cornelius Vanderbilt II (1843–1899)
 Alice Gwynne Vanderbilt (1869–1874)
 William Henry Vanderbilt II (1870–1892)
 Cornelius Vanderbilt III (1873–1942)
 Cornelius Vanderbilt IV (1898–1974)
 Gertrude Vanderbilt (1875–1942)
 Flora Payne Whitney (1897–1986)
 Pamela Tower (1921–2013)
 John LeBoutillier (born 1953)
 Whitney Tower (1923–1999)
 Flora Miller Biddle (born 1928)
Barbara Whitney (1903–1983)
Cornelius Vanderbilt Whitney (1899–1992)
 Alfred Gwynne Vanderbilt (1877–1915)
 Governor William Henry Vanderbilt III (1901–1981)
 Alfred Gwynne Vanderbilt Jr. (1912–1999)
 Alfred Gwynne Vanderbilt III (born 1949)
 James Platten Vanderbilt (born 1975)
 George Washington Vanderbilt III (1914–1961)
 Reginald Claypoole Vanderbilt (1880–1925)
 Cathleen Vanderbilt (1904–1944)
 Gloria Laura Vanderbilt (1924–2019)
  Leopold Stanislaus "Stan" Stokowski (born 1950)
 Christopher Stokowski (born 1952)
 Carter Vanderbilt Cooper (1965–1988)
 Anderson Hays Cooper (born 1967)
 Wyatt Morgan Cooper (born 2020)
 Sebastian Luke Maisani-Cooper (born 2022)
 Gladys Moore Vanderbilt (1886–1965)
 Countess Cornelia "Gilia" Széchényi (1908–1958)
 Countess Alice "Ai" Széchényi (1911–1974)
 Countess Gladys Széchényi (1913–1978)
 Christopher Denys Stormont Finch-Hatton, 16th Earl of Winchilsea (1936–1999)
 Daniel Finch-Hatton, 17th Earl of Winchilsea (born 1967)
 Tobias Finch-Hatton, Viscount Maidstone (born 1998)
 Countess Sylvia Anita Gabriel Denise Irene Marie "Sylvie" Széchényi (1918–1998)
 Countess Ferdinandine "Bubby" Széchényi (1923–2016)
 Margaret Louisa Vanderbilt (1845–1924)
 Florence Shepard (1869–1869)
 Maria Louise Shepard (1870–1948)
 Edith Shepard (1872–1954)
 Margaret Shepard (1873–1895)
 Alice Louise Vanderbilt Shepard (1874–1950)
 Dave Hennen Morris Jr. (1900–1975)
 Louise Morris (1901–1976)
 Lawrence Morris (1903–1967)
 Noel Morris (1904–1928)
 Emily Hammond Morris (1907–1995)
 Alice Vanderbilt Morris (1911–1986)
 Elliott Fitch Shepard Jr. (1876–1927)
 William Kissam Vanderbilt (1849–1920)
 Consuelo Vanderbilt (1877–1964)
 John Spencer-Churchill, 10th Duke of Marlborough (1897–1972)
 John Spencer-Churchill, 11th Duke of Marlborough (1926–2014)
 Charles James Spencer-Churchill, 12th Duke of Marlborough (born 1955)
 George John Godolphin Spencer-Churchill, Marquess of Blandford (born 1992)
 Lady Henrietta Mary Spencer-Churchill (born 1958)
 Lady Rosemary Spencer-Churchill (born 1929)
 Lord Ivor Spencer-Churchill (1898–1956)
 William Kissam Vanderbilt II (1878–1944)
 Muriel Vanderbilt (1900–1972)
 Harold Stirling Vanderbilt (1884–1970)
 Emily Thorn Vanderbilt (1850–1946)
 Florence Adele Sloane (1873–1960)
 William Douglas Burden (1898–1978)
 Katharine Sage Burden (born 1927)
  Katharine Sage Sohier (born 1954)
 Andrew White Burden (born 1935)
 William Douglas Burden III (born 1965)
 Emily Vanderbilt Sloane (1874–1970)
 Adele Sloane Hammond (1902–1998)
 John Vernon Bevan Olyphant (born 1941)
 Timothy David Olyphant (born 1968)
 John Henry Hammond Jr. (1910–1987)
 John Paul Hammond (born 1942)
 Lila Vanderbilt Sloane (1878–1934)
 Frederick Vanderbilt Field (1905–2000)
 Florence Adele Vanderbilt (1854–1952)
 Alice Twombly (1879–1896)
 Florence Vanderbilt Twombly (1881–1969)
 Alice Twombly Burden (1905–1905)
 William Armistead Moale Burden (1906–1984)
 Shirley Carter Burden (1908–1989)
 Shirley Carter Burden Jr. (1941–1996)
 Ruth Twombly (1884–1954)
 Hamilton McKown Twombly Jr. (1887–1906)
 Frederick William Vanderbilt (1856–1938)
 Eliza "Lila" Osgood Vanderbilt (1860–1936)
 James Watson Webb II (1884–1960)
 Lila Vanderbilt Webb (1913–1961)
 John Currie Wilmerding Jr. (born 1938)
 James Watson Webb III (1916–2000)
 William Seward Webb Jr. (1887–1956)
 Vanderbilt Webb (1891–1956)
 George Washington Vanderbilt II (1862–1914)
 Cornelia Stuyvesant Vanderbilt (1900–1976)
 George Henry Vanderbilt Cecil (1925–2020)
 William Amherst Vanderbilt Cecil (1928–2017)
 Emily Almira Vanderbilt (1823–1896)
 William Knapp Thorn (1851–1911)
 Caroline Roberts Thorn (1858–1949)
 Jeannette Thorn Kissel (1889–1957)
 Aline Thorn Pease (1919-2010)
 Kenneth Peter Lyle Mackay, 4th Earl of Inchcape (born 1943)
 Richard Thorn Pease, 3rd Baronet (1922–2021)
 Richard Peter Pease, 4th Baronet (born 1958)
 Nichola Pease (born 1961)
 Derrick Alix Pease (1927–1998)
 Jonathan Edward Pease (born 1952)
 Cornelius Jeremiah Vanderbilt (1830–1882)

Cornelius Vanderbilt and his descendants (by year of birth) 

Cornelius Vanderbilt (1794–1877), 1st generation
William Henry Vanderbilt (1821–1885), 2nd generation, son of Cornelius Vanderbilt
Cornelius Jeremiah Vanderbilt (1830–1882), 2nd generation, son of Cornelius Vanderbilt
Cornelius Vanderbilt II (1843–1899), 3rd generation, grandson of Cornelius Vanderbilt
Margaret Louisa Vanderbilt (1845–1924), 3rd generation, granddaughter of Cornelius Vanderbilt
William Kissam Vanderbilt (1849–1920), 3rd generation, grandson of Cornelius Vanderbilt
Emily Thorn Vanderbilt (1850–1946), 3rd generation, granddaughter of Cornelius Vanderbilt
William Knapp Thorn (1851–1911), 3rd generation, grandson of Cornelius Vanderbilt
Florence Adele Vanderbilt (1854–1952), 3rd generation, granddaughter of Cornelius Vanderbilt
Frederick William Vanderbilt (1856–1938), 3rd generation, grandson of Cornelius Vanderbilt
Eliza "Lila" Osgood Vanderbilt (1860–1936), 3rd generation, granddaughter of Cornelius Vanderbilt
George Washington Vanderbilt II (1862–1914), 3rd generation, grandson of Cornelius Vanderbilt
Cornelius Vanderbilt III (1873–1942), 4th generation, great-grandson of Cornelius Vanderbilt
Emily Vanderbilt Sloane (1874–1970), 4th generation, great-granddaughter of Cornelius Vanderbilt
Alice Louise Vanderbilt Shepard (1874–1950), 4th generation, great-granddaughter of Cornelius Vanderbilt
Gertrude Vanderbilt (1875–1942), 4th generation, great-granddaughter of Cornelius Vanderbilt
Elliott Fitch Shepard Jr. (1876–1927), 4th generation, great-grandson of Cornelius Vanderbilt
Alfred Gwynne Vanderbilt (1877–1915), 4th generation, great-grandson of Cornelius Vanderbilt
Consuelo Vanderbilt (1877–1964), 4th generation, great-granddaughter of Cornelius Vanderbilt
William Kissam Vanderbilt II (1878–1944), 4th generation, great-grandson of Cornelius Vanderbilt
Reginald Claypoole Vanderbilt (1880–1925), 4th generation, great-grandson of Cornelius Vanderbilt
James Watson Webb II (1884–1960), 4th generation, great-grandson of Cornelius Vanderbilt
Harold Stirling Vanderbilt (1884–1970), 4th generation, great-grandson of Cornelius Vanderbilt
Gladys Moore Vanderbilt (1886–1965), 4th generation, great-granddaughter of Cornelius Vanderbilt
Flora Payne Whitney (1897–1986), 5th generation, great-great-granddaughter of Cornelius Vanderbilt
John Spencer-Churchill, 10th Duke of Marlborough (1897–1972), 5th generation, great-great-grandson of Cornelius Vanderbilt
Cornelius Vanderbilt IV (1898–1974), 5th generation, great-great-grandson of Cornelius Vanderbilt
William Douglas Burden (1898–1978), 5th generation, great-great-grandson of Cornelius Vanderbilt
Lord Ivor Spencer-Churchill (1898–1956), 5th generation, great-great-grandson of Cornelius Vanderbilt
Cornelius Vanderbilt Whitney (1899–1992), 5th generation, great-great-grandson of Cornelius Vanderbilt
Muriel Vanderbilt (1900–1972), 5th generation, great-great-granddaughter of Cornelius Vanderbilt
Cornelia Stuyvesant Vanderbilt (1900–1976), 4th generation, great-granddaughter of Cornelius Vanderbilt
Governor William Henry Vanderbilt III (1901–1981)
Mary Cathleen Vanderbilt (1904–1944)
Frederick Vanderbilt Field (1905–2000)
William Armistead Moale Burden II (1906–1984)
Shirley Carter Burden (1908–1989), 5th generation, great-great-grandson of Cornelius Vanderbilt
John Henry Hammond Jr. (1910–1987), 5th generation, great-great-grandson of Cornelius Vanderbilt
Alfred Gwynne Vanderbilt Jr. (1912–1999), 5th generation, great-great-grandson of Cornelius Vanderbilt
George Washington Vanderbilt III (1914–1961), 5th generation, great-great-grandson of Cornelius Vanderbilt
James Watson Webb III (1916–2000)
Sir Richard Thorn Pease, 3rd Baronet (1922–2021)
Whitney Tower (1923–1999)
Gloria Laura Vanderbilt (1924–2019)
George Henry Vanderbilt Cecil (1925–2020)
John Spencer-Churchill, 11th Duke of Marlborough (1926–2014), 6th generation (3 × great-grandson of Cornelius Vanderbilt)
William Amherst Vanderbilt Cecil (1928–2017)
Flora Miller Biddle (born 1928)
Lady Rosemary Spencer-Churchill (born 1929)
Christopher Denys Stormont Finch-Hatton, 16th Earl of Winchilsea (1936–1999), 6th generation (3 × great-grandson of Cornelius Vanderbilt)
John Wilmerding (born 1938), 6th generation (3 × great-grandson of Cornelius Vanderbilt)
Shirley Carter Burden Jr. (1941–1996), 6th generation (3 × great-grandson of Cornelius Vanderbilt)
John Paul Hammond (born 1942), 6th generation (3 × great-grandson of Cornelius Vanderbilt)
Kenneth Peter Lyle Mackay, 4th Earl of Inchcape (born 1943), 6th generation (3 × great-grandson of Cornelius Vanderbilt)
Jonathan Edward Pease (born 1952), 6th generation (3 × great-grandson of Cornelius Vanderbilt)
John LeBoutillier (born 1953), 7th generation (4 × great-grandson of Cornelius Vanderbilt)
Sage Sohier (born 1954), 7th generation (4 × great-granddaughter of Cornelius Vanderbilt)
Charles James Spencer-Churchill, 12th Duke of Marlborough (born 1955), 7th generation (4 × great-grandson of Cornelius Vanderbilt)
Sir Richard Peter Pease, 4th Baronet (born 1958), 6th generation (3 × great-grandson of Cornelius Vanderbilt)
Lady Henrietta Mary Spencer-Churchill (born 1958), 7th generation (4 × great-granddaughter of Cornelius Vanderbilt)
Nichola Pease (born 1961), 6th generation (3 × great-granddaughter of Cornelius Vanderbilt)
William Douglas Burden III (born 1965), 7th generation (4 × great-grandson of Cornelius Vanderbilt)
Anderson Hays Cooper (born 1967), 6th generation (3 × great-grandson of Cornelius Vanderbilt)
Daniel Finch-Hatton, 17th Earl of Winchilsea (born 1967), 7th generation (4 × great-grandson of Cornelius Vanderbilt)
Timothy David Olyphant (born 1968), 7th generation (4 × great-grandson of Cornelius Vanderbilt)
James Platten Vanderbilt (born 1975), 7th generation (4 × great-grandson of Cornelius Vanderbilt)
George John Godolphin Spencer-Churchill, Marquess of Blandford (born 1992), 8th generation (5 × great-grandson of Cornelius Vanderbilt)

Other Vanderbilt descendants, but not of Cornelius Vanderbilt 
Amy Vanderbilt (1908–1974) — believed to be a descended from either a brother or a cousin of Cornelius Vanderbilt

Spouses of descendants of Cornelius Vanderbilt (by year of birth)
Horace F. Clark (1815–1873): 1st husband of Maria Louisa Vanderbilt
Nicholas B. La Bau (1823–1873): 1st husband of Mary Alicia Vanderbilt
Elliott Fitch Shepard (1833–1893): husband of Margaret Louisa Vanderbilt Shepard
Frank Armstrong Crawford Vanderbilt (1839–1885): 2nd wife of Cornelius Vanderbilt
William Douglas Sloane (1844–1915): 1st husband of Emily Thorn Vanderbilt
Alice Claypoole Vanderbilt (1845–1934): wife of Cornelius Vanderbilt II
Hamilton McKown Twombly (1849–1910): husband of Florence Adele Vanderbilt Twombly
Henry White (1850–1927): 2nd husband of Emily Thorn Vanderbilt
William Seward Webb (1851–1926): husband of Eliza Osgood Vanderbilt Webb
Alva Belmont (1853–1933): 1st wife of William Kissam Vanderbilt
Louise Vanderbilt (1854–1926): wife of Frederick William Vanderbilt
Anne Harriman Vanderbilt (1861–1940): 2nd wife of William Kissam Vanderbilt
Richard M. Tobin (1866–1952): 2nd husband of Florence Adele Sloane
Jacques Balsan (1868–1956): 2nd husband of Consuelo Vanderbilt
Grace Vanderbilt (1870–1953): wife of Cornelius Vanderbilt III
James A. Burden Jr. (1871–1932): 1st husband of Florence Adele Sloane
Charles Spencer-Churchill, 9th Duke of Marlborough (1871–1934): 1st husband of Consuelo Vanderbilt
Dave Hennen Morris (1872–1944): husband of Alice Vanderbilt Morris
Harry Payne Whitney (1872–1930): husband of Gertrude Vanderbilt Whitney
Edith Stuyvesant Gerry (1873–1958): wife of George Washington Vanderbilt II
Virginia Fair Vanderbilt (1875–1935): 1st wife of William Kissam Vanderbilt II
George G. McMurtry (1876–1958): 4th husband of Teresa Sarah Margaret Fabbri
László Széchenyi (1879–1938): husband of Gladys Vanderbilt Széchenyi
Ralph Pulitzer (1879–1939): 1st husband of Frederica Vanderbilt Webb
Leopold Stokowski (1882–1977): 2nd husband of Gloria Vanderbilt
Electra Havemeyer Webb (1888–1960): wife of James Watson Webb II
Frederick Osborn (1889–1981): husband of Margaret Louisa Schieffelin
John Francis Amherst Cecil (1890–1954): 1st husband of Cornelia Stuyvesant Vanderbilt
Vivian Francis Bulkeley-Johnson (1891–1968): 2nd husband of Cornelia Stuyvesant Vanderbilt
Aileen Osborn Webb (1892–1979): wife of Vanderbilt Webb
Frederic Cameron Church Jr. (1897–1983): 1st husband of Muriel Vanderbilt
John J. Emery (1898–1976): 2nd husband of Adele Sloane Hammond
Jack Speiden (1900–1970): 2nd husband of Rachel Hammond
Arthur Duckworth (1901–1986): 1st husband of Alice Frances Hammond
Gertrude Conaway Vanderbilt (1901–1978): wife of Harold Stirling Vanderbilt
Marie Norton Harriman (1903–1970): 1st wife of Cornelius Vanderbilt Whitney
Charles Bosanquet (1903–1986): husband of Barbara Schieffelin
Earl E. T. Smith (1903–1991): 1st husband of Consuelo Vanderbilt Earl
Gloria Morgan Vanderbilt (1904–1965): 2nd wife of Reginald Claypoole Vanderbilt
Dunbar Bostwick (1908–2006): husband of Electra Webb
George W. Headley (1908–1985): 3rd husband of Barbara Vanderbilt Whitney
Eleanor Searle (1908–2002): 3rd wife of Cornelius Vanderbilt Whitney
Pat DiCicco (1909–1978): 1st husband of Gloria Vanderbilt
Benny Goodman (1909–1986): 2nd husband of Alice Frances Hammond
Edward P. Morgan (1910–1993): 2nd husband of Katharine Sage Burden
Christopher Finch-Hatton, 15th Earl of Winchilsea (1911–1950): 1st husband of Countess Gladys Széchényi
Edwin F. Russell (1914–2001): 1st husband of Lady Sarah Consuelo Spencer-Churchill 
Laura Spencer-Churchill, Duchess of Marlborough (1915–1990): 2nd wife of John Spencer-Churchill, 10th Duke of Marlborough
Louis Auchincloss (1917–2010): husband of Adele Burden Lawrence
Kenneth James William Mackay, 3rd Earl of Inchcape (1917–1994): 2nd husband of Aline Thorn Pease
Orin Lehman (1920–2008): husband of Wendy Vanderbilt
Edwin D. Morgan (1921–2001): 1st husband of Nancy Marie Whitney
Charles Scribner IV (1921–1995): husband of Jeanette "Joan" Kissel Sunderland
Stanley Schachter (1922–1997): husband of Sophia Duckworth
Sidney Lumet (1924–2011): 3rd husband of Gloria Vanderbilt
Marylou Whitney (1925–2019): 4th wife of Cornelius Vanderbilt Whitney
Wyatt Emory Cooper (1927–1978): 4th husband of Gloria Vanderbilt
Tina Onassis Niarchos (1929–1974): 2nd wife of John Spencer-Churchill, 11th Duke of Marlborough
Rosalba Neri (born 1939): 3rd wife of Henry Cooke Cushing IV
Rosita Spencer-Churchill, Duchess of Marlborough (born 1943): 3rd wife of John Spencer-Churchill, 11th Duke of Marlborough
Amanda Burden (born 1944): 1st wife of Carter Burden
Neil Balfour (born 1944): 3rd husband of Serena Mary Churchill Russell
James Toback (born 1944): 1st husband of Consuelo Sarah Churchill Vanderbilt Russell
David Rosengarten (born 1950): husband of Constance Crimmins Childs
John Silvester Varley (born 1956): husband of Carolyn Thorn Pease
Crispin Odey (born 1959): husband of Nichola Pease
Edla Spencer-Churchill, Duchess of Marlborough (born 1968): 2nd wife of James Spencer-Churchill, 12th Duke of Marlborough

Network

Associates

Horace Henry Baxter
August Belmont Jr.
Samuel R. Callaway
George Henry Daniels
Chauncey Depew
Daniel Drew
Melville E. Ingalls
Oroondates Mauran
Holland Nimmons McTyeire
Charles Morgan
J.P. Morgan
Richard Morris Hunt
Augustus Schell
Carl A. Schenck
T. F. Secor
Winnaretta Singer
Alfred Holland Smith
Amasa Stone

Businesses

Allaire Iron Works
Beech Creek Railroad
Big Four Railroad
Biltmore Farms Company
Canada Southern Railway
Chesapeake and Ohio Railway
Dunkirk, Allegheny Valley & Pittsburgh Railroad
Fort Wayne and Jackson Railroad
Hudson Bay Mining & Smelting Company
Interborough Rapid Transit Company
Lake Erie and Western Railroad
Lake Shore and Michigan Southern Railway
Michigan Central Railroad
Mohawk and Malone Railway
New York Central Railroad
New York and Putnam Railroad
New York State Railways
Nickel Plate Road
Pimlico Race Course
Pittsburgh and Lake Erie Railroad
Rome, Watertown & Ogdensburg Railroad
Rutland Railroad
Sagamore Farm
Staten Island Ferry
Toronto, Hamilton and Buffalo Railway
Vanderbilt Hotel
West Shore Railroad

Philanthropy & miscellaneous nonprofits

American Women's War Relief Fund
Biltmore Forest School
Foch Hospital
International Auxiliary Language Association
The Jockey Club
Margaret Louisa Home
Metropolitan Opera
Parents' League of New York
Scarborough Presbyterian Church
Sleepy Hollow Country Club
Sloane Hospital for Women
Vanderbilt Cup
Vanderbilt Gallery (American Fine Arts Society)
Vanderbilt Clinic (Presbyterian Hospital)
Vanderbilt University

Buildings, estates & historic sites

Biltmore Estate
The Breakers
Cathedral of All Souls (Asheville, North Carolina)
Cornelius Vanderbilt II House
Florham
Howard Mansion and Carriage House
Idle Hour
Marble House
Pine Tree Point
Radisson Blu Edwardian Vanderbilt Hotel
Rough Point
Hyde Park Mansion
Vanderbilt Family Cemetery and Mausoleum
Vanderbilt Triple Palace
William K. Vanderbilt House

See also 

 Vanderbilt (surname)
 Nate Archibald (Gossip Girl), fictional Vanderbilt descendant
 Du Pont family
 Rockefeller family
 Rothschild family

References 

 
American railway entrepreneurs
American families of Dutch ancestry
Noble families
Business families of the United States
Family trees
Episcopalian families
Dutch families
17th-century Dutch emigrants to North America